William Onslow may refer to:

William Onslow, 4th Earl of Onslow (1853–1911)
William Onslow, 6th Earl of Onslow (1913–1971)